The following lists events that happened in 2008 in Lebanon.

Incumbents
President: Fouad Siniora (acting) (until 25 May), Michel Suleiman (starting 25 May)
Prime Minister: Fouad Siniora

Events

May
May 8 - 2008 conflict in Lebanon: Fighting erupts after an 18 month political crisis between pro-government and opposition militias across in Beirut after the government shuts down Hezbollah's telecommunication network. Fighting soon spread to other areas of the country, including Tripoli and Aley.
May 21 - The Doha Agreement is signed by rival factions, ending the conflict.

References

 
Lebanon
2000s in Lebanon
Years of the 21st century in Lebanon
Lebanon